P Kalyanasundaram is a retired librarian from Tamil Nadu, India who donated his savings, pension and award money for charity. He has been donating his earnings for last 30 years.

References 

Living people
Social workers
Social workers from Tamil Nadu
Year of birth missing (living people)